Maxine Seear (born 18 December 1984 in Johannesburg, South Africa) is an athlete from Australia, who competes in triathlons. Seear competed at the second Olympic triathlon at the 2004 Summer Olympics.  She did not finish the competition.

She attended St Peters Lutheran College in her high school years, a private school in Brisbane, Australia.

References
 Profile

1984 births
Living people
Australian female triathletes
Olympic triathletes of Australia
Triathletes at the 2004 Summer Olympics
Sportspeople from Johannesburg
20th-century Australian women
21st-century Australian women